Bror Erik Byléhn (15 January 1898 – 14 November 1986) was a middle-distance runner from Sweden who competed at the 1924 and 1928 Olympics. In 1924 he won a silver medal in the 4 × 400 m relay and failed to reach the finals of individual 400 m and 800 m races. Four years later he won a silver medal in the 800 m, whereas his 4 × 400 m team finished in fourth place.

Byléhn worked as a veterinary doctor in Karlstad, and later moved to the United States.

References

External links 
 

1898 births
1986 deaths
Swedish male middle-distance runners
Athletes (track and field) at the 1924 Summer Olympics
Athletes (track and field) at the 1928 Summer Olympics
Olympic athletes of Sweden
Olympic silver medalists for Sweden
Medalists at the 1928 Summer Olympics
Medalists at the 1924 Summer Olympics
Olympic silver medalists in athletics (track and field)
People from Bollnäs
Sportspeople from Gävleborg County
19th-century Swedish people
20th-century Swedish people